Leonard Henry Rochford,  (10 November 1896 – 17 December 1986) was a British flying ace of the First World War, credited with 29 aerial victories. He returned to military service in the Royal Air Force during the Second World War.

First World War
Born in Enfield on 10 November 1896, Rochford attempted to join the Royal Naval Air Service (RNAS) at the outbreak of the First World War but was rejected as being underage. Instead he went to university and also learned to fly, being granted Royal Aero Club Aviators' Certificate No. 1840 after soloing an L. & P. biplane, at the London and Provincial School, Hendon, on 7 October 1915.

Rochford finally joined the Royal Navy in early 1916 as a probationary temporary flight sub-lieutenant, to serve in the Royal Naval Air Service, and was confirmed in his rank on 14 May 1916. He was posted to No. 3 Naval Squadron RNAS in January 1917. Initially flying a Sopwith Pup, he gained his first three aerial victories between March and July 1917., also gaining promotion to flight lieutenant on 30 June 1917.

Rochford's squadron was then re-equipped with the Sopwith Camel, and Rochford gained two more victories in September to attain "ace" status. He gained three more victories in January 1918, and six in March, bringing his total to fourteen. On 1 April 1918 the Royal Naval Air Service was merged with the Army's Royal Flying Corps to form the Royal Air Force (RAF), and Rochford's unit was renamed and renumbered as No. 203 Squadron RAF. He went on to gain five more victories in May, two in June, and four in July, and his final four between August and October. His 29 claims consisted of 13 enemy aircraft destroyed (including 7 shared), and 16 driven down out of control (including 5 shared).

List of aerial victories

Awards and citations
Distinguished Service Cross 

Bar to the Distinguished Service Cross 

Distinguished Flying Cross

Inter-war career
Rochford was transferred to the RAF unemployed list on 17 April 1919, and received a mention in despatches in May "for valuable services rendered during the war". He was restored to the active list for temporary duty, with the rank of flight lieutenant, between 13 April and 4 June 1921, before being transferred back to the unemployed list.

Second World War
On 9 May 1939, as the threat of war with Germany loomed, Rochford was granted a commission (Class CC) in the Reserve of Air Force Officers (RAFO), with the rank of flying officer (honorary flight lieutenant). On 1 September 1939, the day that the German invasion of Poland began, Rochford relinquished his commission in the RAFO, and was appointed a flight lieutenant in the Royal Air Force Volunteer Reserve. He was promoted to squadron leader on 1 March 1942.

Rochford remained a reserve officer post-war, eventually relinquishing his commission on 10 February 1954, and was granted permission to retain his rank.

Rochford appeared as a contributor in the 1987 documentary 'The Cavalry of the Clouds', produced by British regional commercial television station 'HTV West'.

Personal life
Rochford married Elizabeth Maud Moffet (1895–1964). They had a son, James Donald Henry Rochford (1921–1986), who joined the Royal Navy during the Second World War, to serve as a lieutenant in Combined Operations, then qualified as a barrister after the war.

Publications

References
Notes

Bibliography

External links
 

1896 births
1986 deaths
People from Enfield, London
Royal Naval Air Service personnel of World War I
Royal Air Force personnel of World War I
British World War I flying aces
Recipients of the Distinguished Flying Cross (United Kingdom)
Recipients of the Distinguished Service Cross (United Kingdom)
Royal Air Force Volunteer Reserve personnel of World War II
Royal Air Force squadron leaders